This is a list of films which have placed number one at the weekend box office in Romania during 2009.

Highest-grossing films

See also
 List of Romanian films
 List of highest-grossing films in Romania

Notes
 In its 4th weekend, Ice Age surpassed Titanic to become the highest-grossing film of all time until it was surpassed latter by Avatar.

References

Romania
2009
2009 in Romanian cinema